Masetti may refer to:

Augusto Masetti (1888–1966), Italian anarchist
Enzo Masetti (1893–1961), Italian composer
Giulio Masetti (1895–1926), Italian race driver
Guido Masetti (1907–1993), Italian footballer
Masonwabe Maseti (born 1987), South African footballer
Umberto Masetti (1926–2006), Italian motorcycle racer
Masetti (born 1990), American/Italian singer/songwriter

Italian-language surnames